The Sagamore of the Wabash is an honorary award created by the U.S. state of Indiana during the term of Governor Ralph F. Gates, who served from 1945 to 1949.  A tri-state meeting was to be held in Louisville with officials from Indiana, Ohio and Kentucky.  Aides to Gates learned that the governor of Kentucky was preparing "Kentucky Colonel" certificates for Gates and Senator Robert A. Taft, who was representing Ohio.  The Indiana delegation decided to create an appropriate award to present in return.

The term sagamore was the term used by Algonquian-speaking American Indian tribes of the northeastern United States for the tribal chiefs.  The Wabash is the "State River" of Indiana and major tributary of the Ohio River.  Each governor since Gates has presented the certificates in his own way.  Until 2006, the award was the highest honor which the Governor of Indiana bestows, a personal tribute usually given to those who rendered distinguished service to the state or to the governor.

Among those who have received Sagamores have been astronauts, presidents, ambassadors, artists, musicians, politicians and citizens who have contributed greatly to Hoosier heritage. There is no official record of the total number presented, as each governor has kept his own roll, just as each has reserved the right to personally select the recipients.  Some individuals have received the award more than once; for example, current Indiana Governor Eric Holcomb has received the award twice and Indiana University chancellor Herman B Wells was honored six times.

Recipients of the Sagamore of the Wabash Award

The Sagamore of the Wabash Award does not have an official list of the number of Sagamore of the Wabash awards presented, but several notable individuals have received the award:
Harold Zisla, 1985, by Gov. Robert D. Orr; abstract expressionist painter and arts educator
Ryan White, 1987 by Gov. Robert Orr; American teenager from Kokomo, Indiana, who became a national poster child for HIV/AIDS in the United States
John Gregg, 1989, 1996, 2002 and 2003 Democratic Speaker of the Indiana House from 1996 to 2003
Tommy John, 1989 by Gov. Evan Bayh, 288-game winner in Major League Baseball and first pitcher to have Tommy John surgery
John Morton-Finney, 1990 by Gov. Evan Bayh
Bob Kevoian and Tom Griswold, 1994 and 2008
Patricia Roy, 1994 by Governor Evan Bayh; Indiana High School Athletics Association, Assistant Commissioner.
Arie Luyendyk, 1999 by Gov. Frank O’Bannon; 1990 and 1997 Indianapolis 500 winner
Bob Chase, 2001 by Gov. Frank O'Bannon; Fort Wayne Komets play-by-play broadcaster.
Mir Masoom Ali, 2002 by Gov. Frank O'Bannon; Ball State University George and Frances Ball Distinguished Professor Emeritus of Statistics
Dorothy Runk Mennen, 2003
Thomas McDermott Jr., 2005; Democratic Mayor of Hammond, Indiana (2004–Present)
Mike Delph, January 2005; Indiana State Senator (December 2005 – present)
Martin C. Jischke, 2007 by Governor Mitch Daniels; 10th president of Purdue University (2000–2007)
David Letterman, 2007 by Gov. Mitch Daniels; comedian and television host
Jeff Gordon, 2015 by Governor Mike Pence, 1994, 1998, 2001, 2004, 2014 Brickyard 400 Winner
Donald Davidson, 2016 by Governor Mike Pence, chief historian of the Indianapolis Motor Speedway and host of The talk of Gasoline Alley.
Seema Verma, 2016 by Governor Mike Pence
Adam Vinatieri, 2017 by Governor Eric Holcomb; placekicker for the Indianapolis Colts (2006–2019)
John Stehr, 2018 by Governor Eric Holcomb; retired television journalist, anchor for WTHR in Indianapolis (1995-2019)
Robin Miller, 2021 by Governor Eric Holcomb

Sachem Award
In 2005, Governor Mitch Daniels designated another state honor, named the Sachem Award.  He determined it would be awarded to only one person each year. It is Indiana's highest honor, and a plaque listing recipients is posted on the first floor of the Indiana Statehouse. It was first introduced in 1970 by Governor Edgar Whitcomb.
 2005: John Wooden, former Purdue University basketball player and college coach
 2006: Theodore Hesburgh, former president of the University of Notre Dame
 2007: Jane Blaffer Owen, in recognition of her philanthropic efforts in historic preservation and the arts
 2008: Bill Gaither and Gloria Gaither, musicians
 2009: Donald C. Danielson, New Castle business and civic leader
 2010: Carl Erskine, former Brooklyn and Los Angeles Dodgers baseball player
 2011: William A. Cook, entrepreneur, philanthropist and historic preservationist, co-founded the medical equipment manufacturer Cook Group
 2012: Ian M. Rolland, former chairman and CEO of Lincoln National Corp.
 2013: Don Wolf, former President and CEO of Do-It Best Corporation based in Fort Wayne, Indiana
 2014: P. E. McAllister, President of MacAllister Machinery and former chairman of the Indianapolis Capital Improvements Board
 2015: Amos Brown, a radio broadcaster who was a fierce defender and leader in the African-American community of Indianapolis
 2017: Eva Mozes Kor, Holocaust survivor and founder of CANDLES Holocaust Museum and Education Center
 2018: Sammy L. Davis, Vietnam veteran and recipient of the Congressional Medal of Honor
 2019: George Rapp, orthopedic surgeon and pioneering inventor of hip prostheses
 2020: Reginald O. Jones Sr., Hoosier businessman, community leader and mentor
 2021: James T. Morris, civic leader, global ambassador, and advocate for youth

Contents of the award
When a Sagamore of the Wabash is given to a recipient it is accompanied by other artifacts. It's uncertain if the contents of the award vary by year or by recipient. The gallery below shows the contents of a specific award given on January 9, 2005.

See also
Great Floridians
Kentucky Colonel
Nebraska Admiral
Rhode Island Commodore

References

Honorary titles of the United States
Indiana culture
State awards and decorations of the United States
Governor of Indiana
1946 establishments in Indiana